Mulgrave is a rural locality in the Shire of Burdekin, Queensland, Australia.

History 
The locality was named and bounded on 23 February 2001.

References 

Shire of Burdekin
Localities in Queensland